Kenneth Graham may refer to:
 Ken Graham, American meteorologist
 Kenneth Graham (trade unionist)

See also
 Kenneth Grahame, British writer
 Kenny Graham, British jazz saxophonist
 Kenny Graham (American football)